Berkeh-ye Khalaf is a village in Suza Rural District, Shahab District, Qeshm County, Hormozgan Province, Iran. At the 2006 census, its population was 314, in 63 families.

References 

Populated places in Qeshm County